Veronica Thörnroos (born 16 July 1962) is a Finnish politician from Åland. She currently serves as the Premier of Åland, a position she has held since 25 November 2019. Prior to entering politics, Thörnroos worked as a nurse.

Political career
Thörnroos' political career began in 1989 when she was elected to the Brändö municipal council. She became a representative of the Provincial Assembly in 2003. In 2009, she also served as Minister of Transport and Minister for Nordic Cooperation until 2011. After that, she served as Minister of Infrastructure, who was responsible for e.g. provincial energy, media and IT affairs. On 25 November 2019, she was appointed as Premier of Åland, having led the Åland Centre in the 2019 Ålandic legislative election.

Personal life
Thörnroos is married to sea captain Jan-Tore Thörnroos. The couple have three daughters.

Political posts
 Premier of Åland, Government of Åland 2019–present
 Member of Parliament of Åland 2003–2009 and 2015–2019
 Minister for Infrastructure, Government of Åland 2009–2015
 Chairwoman, Åland Centre Party 2007–2010 and 2017–present

See also
 Government of Åland
 Parliament of Åland

References

External links
 Ålands lagting
 Åländsk Center

1962 births
Living people
21st-century Finnish women politicians
Women heads of government of non-sovereign entities
Women government ministers of Åland
Premiers of Åland